The National Football League is a professional American football league consisting of 32 teams, divided equally between the National Football Conference (NFC) and the American Football Conference (AFC). The NFL is one of the four major professional sports leagues in North America, and the highest professional level of American football in the world.

This list include the players have spent the most seasons in their entire NFL career with one franchise (minimum 15 seasons). Each player has played at least one game in fifteen different NFL seasons for a single NFL franchise. The seasons are not necessarily consecutive. Time playing on amateur teams or teams out of the NFL are not considered. A franchise may change its location and/or name, but players would be considered to be part of the same franchise.

Some notable players who have been disqualified from this list are Tom Brady (who spent his first 20 seasons playing for the New England Patriots before signing with the Tampa Bay Buccaneers in 2020), Sebastian Janikowski (who spent his first 18 seasons with the Oakland Raiders before signing with the Seattle Seahawks in 2018), Johnny Unitas (who spent his first 17 Seasons with the Baltimore Colts before being traded to the San Diego Chargers in 1973), and Jerry Rice (who spent 16 seasons with the San Francisco 49ers before signing with the Oakland Raiders in 2001).

All-time list
Key

Note: This list is correct through the 2021 NFL season

See also
 List of one-club men in association football
 List of one-club men in rugby league
 List of Major League Baseball players who spent their entire career with one franchise
 List of NHL players who spent their entire career with one franchise
 List of NBA players who have spent their entire career with one franchise

References

Specific

Players who spent their entire career with one franchise
Most Seasons with one franchise
National Football League lists
football, American, NFL